The Sarmatic mixed forests constitute an ecoregion within the temperate broadleaf and mixed forests biome, according to the World Wide Fund for Nature classification (ecoregion PA0436). The term comes from the word "Sarmatia".

Distribution
This ecoregion is situated in Europe between boreal forests/taiga in the north and the broadleaf belt in the south and occupies about 846,100 km² (326,700 mi²) in southernmost Norway, southern Sweden (except southernmost), southwesternmost Finland, northern Lithuania, Latvia, Estonia, northern Belarus and the central part of European Russia.

It is bordered by the ecoregions of Scandinavian and Russian taiga (north), Urals montane tundra and taiga (east), East European forest steppe (southeast), Central European mixed forests (southwest) and Baltic mixed forests (west), as well as by the Baltic Sea.

Description
The ecoregion consists of mixed forests dominated by Quercus robur (which only occasionally occurs farther north), Picea abies (which disappears further south due to insufficient moisture) and Pinus sylvestris (in drier locations). Geobotanically, it is divided between the Central European and Eastern European floristic provinces of the Circumboreal Region of the Holarctic Kingdom.

References

External links 

Temperate broadleaf and mixed forests
Ecoregions of Europe
Ecoregions of Belarus
Ecoregions of Estonia
Ecoregions of Finland
Ecoregions of Latvia
Ecoregions of Lithuania
Ecoregions of Norway
Ecoregions of Russia
Ecoregions of Sweden
Forests of Belarus
Forests of Estonia
Forests of Finland
Forests of Latvia
Forests of Lithuania
Forests of Norway
Forests of Sweden
.
.
.
.
.
.
.
.
Biota of Belarus
Biota of Estonia
Biota of Finland
Biota of Latvia
Biota of Lithuania
Biota of Norway
Biota of Russia
Biota of Sweden